Rik de Voest and Lukáš Rosol were the defending champions but decided not to participate.

Martin Fischer and Philipp Oswald won in the final against Tomasz Bednarek and Mateusz Kowalczyk.

Seeds

Draw

Draw

References
 Main Draw

Oberstaufen Cup - Doubles
Oberstaufen Cup